Redcliffe Peninsula road network is a group of roads that provide access to the Redcliffe Peninsula in Queensland, Australia, and enable travel between the contained communities. The area serviced by the network includes the localities of Clontarf, Kippa-Ring, Margate, Newport, Redcliffe, Rothwell, Scarborough and Woody Point. 

The area hosts a substantial residential community plus many tourism accommodation venues. The estimated population for the area described as the Former Redcliffe Peninsula District as at 30 June 2021  was 64,366.

Roads in the network
The network consists of the following state-controlled roads:

A number of local roads that also link the localities are not included in this article.

Brighton–Redcliffe Road

This road has the following components:

Brighton–Redcliffe Road is a state-controlled road (number 122), part regional and part district, rated as a local road of regional significance (LRRS). All of this road is part of State Route 27. 

The road starts at the intersection of the Deagon Deviation (State Route 26) and Beaconsfield Terrace (State Route 27) in Brighton. It runs north-east across Bramble Bay, over the Houghton Highway (northbound) and the Ted Smout Memorial Bridge (southbound), to Clontarf. It passes the exit to Clontarf–Anzac Avenue Road (Elizabeth Avenue) and continues north-east and east as Hornibrook Esplanade to Woody Point, where the name changes to Oxley Avenue as it turns north.

Continuing north the road passes through Margate and enters Redcliffe, crossing Redcliffe Road (Anzac Avenue) and reaching Klingner Road, where it ends. Oxley Avenue continues north as State Route 27. Each bridge carries three lanes of traffic, and most of the road is a divided four lane carriageway.

Oxley Avenue safety works
A project to provide safety works at five intersections in Redcliffe, three of which are on Oxley Avenue, was underway at March 2022.

Major intersections (Brighton–Redcliffe Road)
All distances are from Google Maps. The road commences in the Brisbane local government area (LGA) but all other intersections are within the Moreton Bay LGA.

Clontarf–Anzac Avenue Road

The road starts as Elizabeth Avenue, becomes Snook Street for a distance, and continues as Elizabeth Avenue. It is part of State Route 26. This is a four lane divided road. There are no major intersections on this road.

New overpass
Construction of an active transport overpass across Elizabeth Avenue was expected to complete in mid-2023.

Deception Bay Road

The road is part of State Route 26. Apart from the Bruce Highway, which it crosses as it leaves Burpengary and enters Deception Bay, there are no major intersections on this road. Part of this road is a four lane divided carriageway.

New bridges
Two new bridges, to carry Deception Bay Road over the Bruce Highway, were under construction from 2020.

Upgrade planning
A preferred planning layout for the upgrade of a section of Deception Bay Road to four lanes has been released for community consultation.

Redcliffe Road

Redcliffe Road is the official name for the road known as Anzac Avenue. The road is signed as State Route 71. Within the Redcliffe Peninsula the road intersects with Deception Bay Road in Rothwell, Clontarf–Anzac Avenue Road in Kippa-Ring, and Brighton–Redcliffe Road in Redcliffe. All of this road is at least a four lane divided carriageway.

Anzac Avenue safety works
A project to provide safety works at five intersections in Redcliffe, two of which are on Anzac Avenue, was underway at March 2022.

History
The first road to the Redcliffe Peninsula was an Aboriginal track used to access a prominent bora ring at what is now Kippa-Ring. A road from Bald Hills to Redcliffe was formed by the early 1860s, but it was not maintained. A better road was surveyed and built in the early 1870s. Anzac Memorial Avenue (as it was originally named) was opened in 1925 as a fully sealed road.

The Hornibrook Bridge, the first crossing of Bramble Bay, was opened in 1935. This was duplicated by the Houghton Highway in 1979. The Ted Smout Memorial Bridge was opened in 2010. With this opening the Hornibrook Bridge was closed in preparation for demolition.

References

Roads in Queensland